Piges is a Charleroi Metro station, located in Dampremy (part of the Charleroi municipality), in fare zone 1. The station is built on a viaduct and is accessed through escalators and stairs from a street entrance located on Chaussée de Bruxelles (Brussels Road).

Although the station is built on a viaduct, tracks enter a tunnel at its western end, as they pass under a spoil tip (Terril des Piges) toward Dampremy.

A tram line to Gosselies starts at the station.

Nearby points of interest 
Station surroundings are sparsely populated (lower part of the Chaussée de Bruxelles) and do not feature important points of interest, which explains the low passenger flow through the station.

Transfers 
TEC Charleroi bus lines 41, 85 and Midi-Docherie.

Charleroi Metro stations
Railway stations opened in 1980